Peschiera del Garda railway station serves the town and comune of Peschiera del Garda, in the region of Veneto, northern Italy.  Opened in 1854, it forms part of the Milan–Venice railway.

The station is currently managed by Rete Ferroviaria Italiana (RFI), a subsidiary of Ferrovie dello Stato (FS), Italy's state-owned rail company. The train services are operated by Trenitalia and Trenord.

Location
Peschiera del Garda railway station is situated in Piazzale Stazione, on the eastern bank of the Mincio River, to the east of the town centre on the western bank.

History
The station was opened on 22 April 1854, together with the Verona–Brescia–Coccaglio section of the Milan–Venice railway.  Between 1859 and 1866, it was a transit station between the international network of the Kingdom of Lombardy–Venetia and that of the Kingdom of Sardinia/Italy.

From 1934 to 1967, the station was adjacent to another station, the FMP station, which was the terminus of a line from Mantua.

Features
The station has a large three storey passenger building.  At ground level, there is a main entrance protected by an arched portico, and inside are the usual services to travellers.  The upper two levels are used for offices and private residences.

Three tracks pass through the station yard.  Each of the outer tracks, one for each direction, is faced by a platform equipped with a wrought iron canopy.  The platforms are connected with each other, and with the passenger building, by elevators and a pedestrian underpass.  The inside track is used for any crossings or overtaking.

In the goods yard is a goods shed now used for storage.  The tracks in the goods yard have been removed and replaced with a parking lot.  Other tracks are used for storage of line maintenance equipment.

Train services
The station is served by the following services:

High speed services (Frecciarossa) Turin - Milan - Brescia - Verona - Vicenza - Padua - Venice (- Trieste)
High speed services (Frecciarossa) Milan - Brescia - Verona - Vicenza - Padua - Venice - Treviso - Udine
EuroCity services Geneva - Brig - Milan - Brescia - Verona - Padua - Venice
Night train (EuroNight) Milan - Verona - Venice - Villach - Klagenfurt - Vienna 
Express services (Treno regionale) Milan - Treviglio - Brescia - Desanzano del Garda - Peschiera del Garda - Verona
Regional services (Treno regionale) Brescia - Desanzano del Garda - Peschiera del Garda - Verona
Regional services (Treno regionale) Brescia - Verona - Vicenza - Padua - Venice (1x per day)

Passenger and train movements
The station is the second busiest in the province of Verona in terms of passenger movements, after Verona Porta Nuova. It is very crowded by commuters, supplemented by tourists during the summer season.

Every day, regional and Frecciabianca trains stop at the station, linking the Garda with Milan, Turin, Venice and Trieste. The station is also served by a EuroCity service linking Geneva in Switzerland and Venice. A night train stops at the station connecting the area with Wien Hauptbahnhof in Austria.

See also

History of rail transport in Italy
List of railway stations in Veneto
Rail transport in Italy
Railway stations in Italy

References

External links

Description and pictures of Peschiera del Garda railway station 

This article is based upon a translation of the Italian language version as at February 2011.

Province of Verona
Railway stations in Veneto
Railway stations opened in 1854
1854 establishments in the Austrian Empire